We'll Get By is an American television sitcom that aired on the CBS network.  The series was created by Alan Alda and ran for twelve episodes from March 14, 1975 to May 30, 1975.

Synopsis
The show featured a typical middle-class New Jersey family, the Platts, and starred Paul Sorvino and Mitzi Hoag. The show aired originally on Fridays at 8:30 p.m., but could be seen in some markets as rebroadcasts on Sunday mornings for the remainder of 1975.

Cast
 Paul Sorvino as George Platt
 Mitzi Hoag as Liz Platt
 Willie Aames as Kenny Platt
 Jerry Houser as Muff Platt
 Devon Scott as Andrea Platt

References

External links 
 

1970s American sitcoms
1975 American television series debuts
1975 American television series endings
Television shows set in New Jersey
CBS original programming
Television series by CBS Studios